There is a Korean American community in the states of Virginia and Maryland in the Washington, DC metropolitan area. It is the third-largest ethnic Korean community in the United States.

In 1949, the Embassy of South Korea opened in Washington, D.C. In 1960, there were about 400 to 500 ethnic Koreans in that city. Most of them were wives of former U.S. soldiers, students, and embassy staff.

In the 1990s, the Korean population in Fairfax County, Virginia, increased sharply. From 1990 to 2011, the Korean population in Fairfax County increased by over 200%. From 2001 to 2011, the Fairfax County Korean population increased by 13,000, or almost 50%.

Demographics
The 2010 U.S. Census stated that 41,356 ethnic Koreans live in Fairfax County, Virginia, making up 3.8% of the county's population, and over 60% of Virginia's ethnic Koreans. Korean-American Association of the Washington, D.C., Metro Area president Steve Choi stated that because some Korean residents of Northern Virginia are illegal immigrants and because many are "very private people" the Korean population was in fact under-counted. As of 2010, the Koreans are Fairfax County's third largest immigrant community. As of the 2000 U.S. Census, 62% of the Koreans in Virginia were in Fairfax County.

Almost 25% of the ethnic Koreans in Fairfax County live in Annandale and Centreville. Annandale houses a Koreatown in the city center, which was active since the late 1980s. University of Maryland Asian American studies professor Larry Shinagawa stated relatively more Koreans in Fairfax County are engaged in business. Dave Seminara of the Fairfax Times stated that area Korean community leaders, including Steve Choi, credited the reputation of the Fairfax County Public Schools and the establishment of nonstop flights between Washington Dulles International Airport and Incheon Airport circa 2001 to the growth of the Fairfax Korean community. Pyong Gap Min, author of Asian Americans: Contemporary Trends and Issues, stated that the suburban lifestyle and proximity to Washington, D.C., made Fairfax County an attractive destination for the ethnic Koreans.

As of the 2000 U.S. Census, there were 39,155 Koreans in the State of Maryland; 40% of them were in Montgomery County, Maryland, in the Washington, D.C., area. Shinagawa stated that Koreans in Maryland are more likely to have high education compared to those in Virginia and that they tend to work in banking, government, law, and science.

Economy
As of 2006, many Koreans in Fairfax County, Virginia operate businesses in Washington, D.C., and work for the Federal Government of the United States.
 
After Korean immigration began, many ethnic Koreans lived in northern Virginia while owning businesses in Washington, D.C. Liz Farmer of the Washington Examiner stated that during the early 1990s there were not very many Korean businesses in Annandale, Virginia. After the early 1990s increasing numbers of Korean businesses opened in Virginia. University of Maryland professor Larry Shinagawa stated that more Korean businesses opened in Virginia than in Maryland due to differing tax rates.

Institutions

The South Korean government maintains the Embassy of South Korea, Washington, D.C.

Politics

The Washington Post printed an editorial arguing that Virginia state officials who were promising to take pro-Korean actions regarding the Sea of Japan (East Sea) dispute and the Fairfax County government establishing a World War II comfort women memorial were "pandering" and were not appropriate.

Media
As of 2011, four Korean-language newspapers, three Korean-language television channels, and one Korean-language radio station are in Northern Virginia.

Education
Fairfax County Public Schools offers Korean language classes at Fairfax High School Academy and at four elementary schools, open to both ethnic Koreans and non ethnic-Koreans. As of September 2010 the school district had 6,387 students who natively speak Korean.

Recreation
The Montgomery County, Maryland government has established Korean-American Day.

Religion
For Protestants, the Korean Central Presbyterian Church is in Centreville.
For Catholics, the St. Paul Chung Korean Catholic Church is in Centreville.

Notable residents
 John Myung (poker player) - Vienna, Virginia
 Seung-Hui Cho (perpetrator of the Virginia Tech massacre) - Centreville, Virginia

See also
 History of the Koreans in Baltimore
 Old Korean Legation Museum

References

Further reading

External links
 The Korean-American Association of Washington Metro Area (KAAW; 워싱턴지구 한인연합회)
 The Korean-American Association of Virginia (KAVA; 버지니아한인회)
 Sejong Society of Washington, D.C.
 Korean American Bar Association of Washington, D.C. (KABA-DC)

Asian-American culture in Washington, D.C.
Washington